The 2020–21 Biathlon World Cup – Stage 8 was the 8th event of the season and was held in Nové Město, Czech Republic, from 4 to 7 March 2021.

Schedule of events 
The events took place at the following times.

Medal winners

Men

Women

References 

Biathlon World Cup - Stage 8
2020–21 Biathlon World Cup
Biathlon competitions in the Czech Republic
Biathlon World Cup